Connarus is a genus of plants in the family Connaraceae.

Description
Connarus species are usually woody climbers, occasionally shrubs or trees. The flowers are bisexual and fragrant. The fruits are pod-like.

Distribution and habitat
Connarus species are distributed widely throughout the tropics, including Borneo.

Species
 The Plant List recognises 110 accepted taxa (of species and infraspecific names):

 Connarus africanus  
 Connarus agamae  
 Connarus andamanicus  
 Connarus annamensis  
 Connarus bariensis  
 Connarus beyrichii  
 Connarus blanchetii  
 var. laurifolius  
 Connarus brachybotryosus  
 Connarus bracteosovillosus  
 Connarus celatus  
 Connarus championii  
 Connarus cochinchinensis  
 Connarus conchocarpus  
 subsp. schumannianus  
 Connarus congolanus  
 Connarus cordatus  
 Connarus coriaceus  
 Connarus costaricensis  
 Connarus culionensis  
 var. stellatus  
 Connarus cuneifolius  
 Connarus detersoides  
 Connarus detersus  
 Connarus ecuadorensis  
 Connarus ellipticus  
 Connarus elsae  
 Connarus erianthus  
 Connarus euphlebius  
 Connarus fasciculatus  
 subsp. pachyneurus  
 Connarus favosus  
 Connarus ferrugineus  
 Connarus gabonensis  
 Connarus grandifolius  
 Connarus grandis  
 Connarus griffonianus  
 Connarus guggenheimii  
 Connarus impressinervis  
 Connarus incomptus  
 Connarus jaramilloi  
 Connarus kingii  
 Connarus lambertii  
 Connarus lamii  
 Connarus latifolius  
 Connarus lentiginosus  
 Connarus longipetalus  
 Connarus longistipitatus  
 Connarus lucens  
 Connarus marginatus  
 Connarus marlenei  
 Connarus martii  
 Connarus megacarpus  
 Connarus monocarpus  
 subsp. malayensis  
 Connarus nervatus  
 Connarus nicobaricus  
 Connarus nodosus  
 Connarus oblongus  
 Connarus odoratus  
 Connarus ovatifolius  
 Connarus panamensis  
 Connarus paniculatus  
 Connarus parameswaranii  
 Connarus patrisii  
 Connarus peltatus  
 Connarus perrottetii  
 var. angustifolius  
 Connarus perturbatus  
 Connarus pickeringii  
 Connarus planchonianus  
 Connarus poilanei  
 Connarus popenoei  
 Connarus portosegurensis  
 Connarus punctatus  
 Connarus regnellii  
 Connarus renteriae  
 Connarus reticulatus  
 Connarus rigidus  
 Connarus rostratus  
 Connarus ruber  
 var. acutissimus  
 var. sprucei  
 Connarus salomoniensis  
 Connarus schultesii  
 Connarus sclerocarpus  
 Connarus semidecandrus  
 Connarus silvanensis  
 Connarus staudtii  
 Connarus stenophyllus  
 Connarus steyermarkii  
 Connarus suberosus  
 Connarus subfoveolatus  
 Connarus subinequifolius  
 Connarus subpeltatus  
 Connarus thonningii  
 Connarus touranensis  
 Connarus turczaninowii  
 Connarus venezuelanus  
 var. orinocensis  
 Connarus villosus  
 Connarus vulcanicus  
 Connarus whitfordii  
 Connarus wightii  
 Connarus williamsii  
 var. allenii  
 Connarus winkleri  
 Connarus wurdackii  
 Connarus xylocarpus  
 Connarus yunnanensis

References

Connaraceae
Oxalidales genera